Walter Greiner (29 October 1935 – 6 October 2016) was a German theoretical physicist. His research interests lay in atomic physics, heavy ion physics, nuclear physics, elementary particle physics (particularly in quantum electrodynamics and quantum chromodynamics). He is known for his series of books in theoretical physics, particularly in Germany but also around the world.

Biography

Greiner was born on 29 October 1935, in Neuenbau, Sonnenberg, Germany.

He studied physics at the University of Frankfurt (Goethe University Frankfurt), receiving a BSci in physics, a master's degree in 1960 with a thesis on Plasma-reactors, and a PhD in 1961 at the University of Freiburg under , with a thesis on the nuclear polarization in μ-mesic atoms. From 1962 to 1964, he was assistant professor at the University of Maryland, followed by a Research Associate position at the University of Freiburg in 1964.

Starting in 1965, he became a full professor at the Institute for Theoretical Physics at Goethe University Frankfurt until 1995.

Greiner has been a visiting professor to many universities and laboratories, including Florida State University, the University of Virginia, the University of California, the University of Melbourne, Vanderbilt University, Yale University, Oak Ridge National Laboratory, and Los Alamos National Laboratory.

In 2003, with Wolf Singer, he was the founding Director of the Frankfurt Institute for Advanced Studies (FIAS), and gave lectures and seminars in elementary particle physics. He died on 6 October 2016 at the age of 80.

After Greiner's death, several books and articles were published as tributes to him.

Graduate students

His doctoral students include Berndt Müller, Johann Rafelski and Horst Stöcker.

The scientist Dr. Sabine Hossenfelder was among his students.

Awards

Greiner has received numerous scientific awards, including the Max Born Prize, the Otto Hahn Prize, and the Alexander von Humboldt Medal. Many of his students are holders of chairs at home and abroad or employees at renowned scientific institutions.

Books

Greiner's books cover most of theoretical physics, although there are more in the areas of his research (quantum mechanics and field theory, with applications). Following are the English translations of the books. See the German Wikipedia for the original German editions (which includes a volume on hydrodynamics, not published in the English series).

Classical theoretical physics series

Theoretical physics series

References

External links

Summary of his books

1935 births
2016 deaths
Theoretical physicists
University of Freiburg alumni
20th-century  German physicists
21st-century  German physicists
Goethe University Frankfurt alumni
Academic staff of Goethe University Frankfurt
University of Maryland, College Park faculty